2022 in women's road cycling is about the 2022 women's bicycle races ruled by the UCI and the 2022 UCI Women's Teams.

World Championships

UCI Women's WorldTour

UCI Women's ProSeries

Single day races (1.1 and 1.2)

Stage races (2.1 and 2.2)

Single day races (1.NE)

Stage races (2.NE)

Junior races (1.Ncup and 2.Ncup)

Other

Continental Championships

Teams

References

 

Women's road cycling by year